Thompson Peaks is a two peaks on the divide between upper Moody Glacier and Bingley Glacier in the Queen Alexandra Range. Named by Advisory Committee on Antarctic Names (US-ACAN) for Douglas C. Thompson, United States Antarctic Research Program (USARP) cosmic rays scientist at McMurdo Station, 1963; South Pole Station, 1965.

Mountains of the Ross Dependency
Shackleton Coast